National Route 87 is a national highway in South Korea connects Pocheon to Cheorwon County. It opened on 25 July 2001.

Main stopovers
Gyeonggi Province
 Pocheon
Gangwon Provinve
 Cheorwon County

Major intersections

 (■): Motorway
IS: Intersection, IC: Interchange

Gyeonggi Province

Gangwon Province

References

87
Roads in Gyeonggi
Roads in Gangwon